Charles Burke Guignon (February 1, 1944 – May 23, 2020) was an American philosopher and Professor Emeritus of Philosophy at the University of South Florida. He is known for his expertise on Martin Heidegger's philosophy and existentialism. He became a member of the Florida Philosophical Association in the early 2000s.

Bibliography
 Heidegger and the Problem of Knowledge (Indianapolis: Hackett Publishing Co., 1983).
 Editor, Dostoevsky's "The Grand Inquisitor," with Related Chapters of "The Brothers Karamazov" (Indianapolis: Hackett, 1993). Includes a 40-page editor's introduction.
 Co-editor (with D. Pereboom), Existentialism: Basic Writings (Indianapolis: Hackett, 1995). Book introduction and introductions to Nietzsche and Heidegger.
 Editor, The Good Life (Indianapolis: Hackett, 1999). Book introduction and introductions to 25 readings.
 (with Frank C. Richardson and Blaine Fowers). Re-envisioning Psychology: Moral Dimensions of Theory and Practice (San Francisco: Jossey-Bass, 1999).
 Co-editor (with David C. Hiley). Richard Rorty, “Philosophy in Focus” series (Cambridge: Cambridge University Press, 2003).
 Editor, The Existentialists (Lanham, MD: Rowman & Littlefield, 2004).
 On Being Authentic (a volume in the Thinking in Action series) (London: Routledge, 2004).
 Editor, Cambridge Companion to Heidegger (Cambridge: Cambridge University Press, 1993). Includes editor's introduction and one chapter ("Authenticity, Moral Values, and Psychotherapy"). [Translated in Portuguese and Romanian]. Second enlarged edition, with new editor's Preface: 2006. [Translated into Chinese].
 Dostoevsky's "Notes from the Underground", edited with an Introduction (40 pages) with K. Aho (Indianapolis, Ind.: Hackett Publishing, 2009).

See also

Authenticity (philosophy)
The good life
Hubert Dreyfus

References

External links
 Guignon at the USF Philosophy Department
 Guignon's CV

21st-century American philosophers
Phenomenologists
Continental philosophers
Epistemologists
Hermeneutists
Daseinsanalysis
Philosophers from Vermont
Philosophers from Florida
Philosophers from California
Philosophers from Texas
Existentialists
Philosophy academics
Heidegger scholars
University of South Florida faculty
University of Vermont faculty
Princeton University faculty
University of California, Berkeley alumni
University of California, Berkeley faculty
University of Texas at Austin faculty
1944 births
Living people